Édouard Muller (8 June 1919, in Neuilly sur Seine – 28 May 1997, in Maisons-Laffitte) was a French professional road bicycle racer.

Major results

1947
Tour de l'Ouest
1951
GP des Alliés
Paris - Clermont-Ferrand
Paris - Montceau-les-Mines
Tour de France:
Winner stage 6
1953
GP d'Espéraza

References

External links 

Site du cyclisme - photo 2
Official Tour de France results for Edouard Muller

French male cyclists
1919 births
1997 deaths
French Tour de France stage winners
Sportspeople from Neuilly-sur-Seine
Cyclists from Île-de-France